Lukáš Bartošák (born 3 July 1990) is a professional Czech football defender currently playing for Trinity Zlín.

Club career

He made his league debut on 20 March 2010 in FC Hlučín's 1-1 Czech National Football League home draw against Vysočina Jihlava. He scored his first league goal on 1 May 2010 in Hlučín's 3-3 away draw against Baník Sokolov. He signed for Liberec of the Czech First League in 2015, playing 30 league matches and scoring two goals. He moved to Zlín in 2017.

International career

Although Bartošák had not represented the Czech Republic on any youth level, he was reportedly contacted by the Czech Republic national team officials about joining the senior squad for the matches against Serbia and Poland in November 2015, should David Limberský fail to recover from his injury in time. He was officially called up to the national squad on 9 November 2015. He made his national team debut on 17 November 2015 in a 3–1 friendly match defeat against Poland at Stadion Miejski, Wrocław.

References

External links
 
 
 Lukáš Bartošák official international statistics

Czech footballers
1990 births
Living people
Czech First League players
FC Slovan Liberec players
Association football midfielders
Association football defenders
Czech Republic international footballers
FC Fastav Zlín players
FK Viktoria Žižkov players
MFK Karviná players
People from Brumov-Bylnice
Sportspeople from the Zlín Region
Czech National Football League players